The Men's individual compound open archery discipline at the 2016 Summer Paralympics was contested  from September 10 to September 13. Ranking rounds took place on 10 September, while knockout rounds continued on September 13.

In the ranking rounds each archer shot 72 arrows, and was seeded according to score. In the knock-out stages each archer shot three arrows per set against an opponent, and scores were aggregated. Matches were won by the archer with the highest aggregate. Losing semifinalists competed in a bronze medal match.

Ranking Round
PR = Paralympic Record.

Knockout state

Finals

Section 1

Section 2

Section 3

Section 4

References

Men's individual compound open